Shrooms is a 2007 horror film written by Pearse Elliot and directed by Paddy Breathnach. The film stars Lindsey Haun, Jack Huston, and Max Kasch. The plot follows a group of American students and their English guide who are stalked by a serial killer while out in the woods looking for psilocybin mushrooms.

Plot 
American student Tara and her college friends visit Ireland to meet with local resident and friend Jake, and go camping in woodlands surrounding a long-disused children's home. While collecting psilocybin mushrooms for later consumption, Tara eats a death bell mushroom (Galerina) and suffers a seizure after which she experiences dream-like trances in which she begins having premonitions of future events.

Around the evening camp fire, with Tara resting in her tent, Jake tells a ghost story of the empty children's home nearby, and of a violent sadistic monk who survived an assault by one of his charges, as revenge for killing his twin brother. Overhearing this causes Tara to have premonitions of the murders of her friends.

After a deathly row with his girlfriend and the others, aggressive jock Bluto drinks some of the hallucinogenic tea (supposedly for all to share in the morning) and experiences a trip which culminates in his murder, seemingly at the hands of the rogue monk from the children's home.

The following morning, unconcerned by Bluto's disappearance – the others consume the mushroom tea, only to become separated from one another in the woods while under its effects. The three women, arguing and squabbling, get lost until they themselves are split, and Holly and Lisa are violently murdered – in accordance with Tara's continuing visions – after an encounter with local woodsmen Ernie and Bernie.

Jake and Troy find Tara on the bank of a river, and tell her to meet them in the abandoned home to summon help. Upon investigating the property, Troy is apparently killed by the monk, and Jake escapes by jumping from a high window, breaking his leg as he lands.  Tara finds him and the two flee the haunted scene. Then, while resting his leg, he is murdered.

Tara awakes as a Garda helicopter hovers over the camp, and is dispatched into an ambulance as the sole survivor.  As her mobile phone rings, she experiences a rapid flashback and realizes that the death bell mushroom caused her to murder all of her friends. She asks the paramedic for help. Everything becomes quiet until we see her bloody hands holding a pair of bloody scissors which suggests that she has killed the paramedic. The film ends with Tara running in the woods.

Cast 
Lindsey Haun as Tara
Max Kasch as Troy
Jack Huston as Jake
Robert Hoffman as Bluto
Maya Hazen as Lisa
Alice Greczyn as Holly
Don Wycherley as Ernie
Sean McGinley as Bernie
David McGinley as Dale
Toby Sedgwick as Black Brother
André Pollack as The Dog
Jack Gleeson as Lonely Twin
Joe Phelan as Young Lonely Twin
Mike Carbery as Paramedic
Anna Tikhonova as Mysterious Woman 1
Goranna McDonald as Mysterious Woman 2
Berry Murphy as Lonely Twin's Brother
Joe Murphy as Feral Boy
Stuart Rankin as Extra

Production 
An Irish, Danish, and British co-production, Shrooms was shot over a period of seven weeks in April and May 2006 in locations including Gosford Park, County Armagh, Northern Ireland and Rossmore Forest Park in County Monaghan, Ireland.

Reception 
Rotten Tomatoes, a review aggregator, gave it a rating of 22% based on 18 reviews from critics.  Derek Elly of Variety described the film as "A shake-'n'-bake slasher movie that shows just how difficult it is to do effective, modestly budgeted horror".  Séamus Leonard wrote in Raidió Teilifís Éireann's review, "The film definitely looks the part, but is hollow in virtually every other department."  Leonard said the film may play better to non-Irish audiences, but viewers in Ireland will likely find it unintentionally funny.  Writing for The Irish Times, Donald Clarke said the film has "some elegant compositions" but seems assembled from other recent horror films.

See also

List of films featuring hallucinogens

References

External links 
 
 
 
 
 Paddy Breathnach interview on Shrooms

2007 films
2007 horror films
2000s serial killer films
2000s slasher films
English-language Irish films
Fiction with unreliable narrators
Films scored by Dario Marianelli
Films about hallucinogens
Films about vacationing
Films directed by Paddy Breathnach
Films set in forests
Films set in Ireland
Films shot in the Republic of Ireland
Vertigo Films films
Icon Productions films
Irish horror films
Irish slasher films
Danish horror films
British horror films
2000s English-language films
2000s British films